Danielle Younge-Ullman is a Canadian author. She is the author of Everything Beautiful Is Not Ruined. Everything Beautiful Is Not Ruined was nominated for the 2018 White Pine Award and won. Everything Beautiful Is Not Ruined was a finalist for the 2017 Governor General Literary Award for Young People's Literature. She is also the author of He Must Like You.

References

External links 
 CBC interview 

21st-century Canadian women writers
Year of birth missing (living people)
Living people
21st-century Canadian novelists
Canadian writers of young adult literature
Canadian women novelists